Lecythis lanceolata is a species of woody plant in the family Lecythidaceae of the order Ericales. It is endemic to the Atlantic Forest ecoregion in southeast Brazil, where is known as sapucaia-mirim. It was described by Jean Louis Marie Poiret in 1804.

References

lanceolata
Plants described in 1804
Endemic flora of Brazil
Flora of the Atlantic Forest
Flora of Bahia
Flora of Espírito Santo
Flora of Goiás
Flora of Pernambuco
Flora of Rio de Janeiro (state)
Conservation dependent plants
Near threatened flora of South America
Taxonomy articles created by Polbot